New Boston is an unincorporated community in central Lee County, Iowa, United States.  It lies in the southeast corner of Iowa, along U.S. Highway 218 and southwest of the city of Fort Madison, the county seat of Lee County.   New Boston is located nearby to the unincorporated communities of Argyle, Iowa and Charleston, Iowa.  The community is part of the Fort Madison–Keokuk, IA-MO Micropolitan Statistical Area. There are no commercial establishments in New Boston, although this is the home of the New Boston Mennonite Church.

History
Founded in the 1800s, New Boston's population was 56 in 1902, and 26 in 1925.

References

Unincorporated communities in Lee County, Iowa
Unincorporated communities in Iowa
Fort Madison–Keokuk, IA-IL-MO Micropolitan Statistical Area